Niederkassel (Ripuarian: Neddekaaßel) is a town in the Rhein-Sieg district, in North Rhine-Westphalia, Germany, with a population of around 37,000 people. Niederkassel is subdivided into seven quarters (from the south to the north): Mondorf, Rheidt, Niederkassel, Uckendorf, Stockem, Lülsdorf and Ranzel. People can walk next to the river Rhine in Lülsdorf, Niederkassel and Rheidt.

Twin towns – sister cities

Niederkassel is twinned with:
 Limassol, Cyprus
 Premnitz, Germany

Notable people
Ernst Dickmanns (born 1936), engineer, pioneer of dynamic computer vision and of driverless cars
Stephan Engels (born 1960), football player and coach
Sascha Stegemann (born 1984), football referee

References

External links

Towns in North Rhine-Westphalia